Skupština (Скупштина) is a Serbo-Croatian word for assembly, referring to Parliament. As such, it is used in the name of the following assemblies:

 National Assembly of Serbia
 Parliament of Montenegro
 Parliamentary Assembly of Bosnia and Herzegovina
 National Assembly (Republika Srpska)
 Assembly of the Republic of Kosovo
 (former) Parliament of Serbia and Montenegro
 (former) National Assembly of the Kingdom of Yugoslavia
 (former) Parliament of the Kingdom of Montenegro